Metochus hainanensis is a species of dirt-colored seed bug in the family Rhyparochromidae, found in eastern China and Taiwan.

References

External links

 

Rhyparochromidae
Insects described in 1981